is a Japanese water polo player. She was selected to the Japan women's national water polo team, for the 2020 Summer Olympics.

She participated in the 2019 FINA Women's Junior Water Polo World League, and 2021 FINA Women's Water Polo World League.

References 

2002 births
Living people
Japanese female water polo players
Water polo players at the 2020 Summer Olympics
Olympic water polo players of Japan
Sportspeople from Ishikawa Prefecture
21st-century Japanese women